Franciszek Florian Czaki (Csaky de Kerestszegh) (died in 1772) – a famous cartographer, engineer, captain of the Polish artillery, Hungarian by nationality. 
One of the most prominent cartographers of the last Polish king Stanisław August Poniatowski (since 1765). In (1772), he made a set of 24 detailed maps of Poland scaled 1:629 000 "Carte de Pologne...", planned several canals in Poland and in Lithuania, including the Królewski Canal (en: Royal Canal).

External links
 an article  in PWN Oxford (in Polish)

Polish cartographers
1772 deaths
Year of birth unknown
18th-century cartographers
18th-century Polish–Lithuanian military personnel